HMS Barrosa was a  launched on 10 March 1860 at Woolwich Dockyard and scrapped in 1877. She was 225 ft long, 41 ft wide and of 1,700 tons builders measurement, and armed with 16 × 8n, 1 × 7in and 4 × 40pdr guns.

References

 

1860 ships
Corvettes of the Royal Navy
Ships built in Woolwich